Teagueia is a genus of orchids. They are found at high altitudes in the Andes in Colombia, Peru and Ecuador.

Species accepted as of June 2014:

Teagueia alyssana Luer & L.Jost - Ecuador
Teagueia barbeliana L.Jost & Shepard - Ecuador
Teagueia cymbisepala Luer & L.Jost - Ecuador
Teagueia jostii Luer - Ecuador
Teagueia lehmannii Luer - Colombia
Teagueia moisesii Chocce & M.E.Acuña - Peru
Teagueia phasmida (Luer & R.Escobar) O.Gruss & M.Wolff - Colombia
Teagueia portillae Luer - Ecuador
Teagueia puroana L.Jost & Shepard - Ecuador
Teagueia rex (Luer & R.Escobar) O.Gruss & M.Wolff - Colombia
Teagueia sancheziae Luer & L.Jost - Ecuador
Teagueia teaguei (Luer) Luer - Ecuador
Teagueia tentaculata Luer & Hirtz - Ecuador
Teagueia zeus (Luer & Hirtz) O.Gruss & M.Wolff - Ecuador

References 

Orchids of South America
Pleurothallidinae
Pleurothallidinae genera